Kruk is a surname. The word means "raven" in Polish, Belarusian, and Ukrainian languages. It means crutch, handle, stool in Dutch.

The surname  may refer to:
Elżbieta Kruk (born 1959), Polish politician
Frances Kruk, Polish-Canadian poet
Frank Kruk, a protagonist of the eponymous novel by Petras Cvirka
Janusz Kruk, (1946–1992), Polish singer, guitarist and composer
John Kruk (born 1961), American baseball player
Jonathan Kruk, master storyteller who regularly performs at Historic Hudson Valley events
Joseph Kruk (1885−1972), Polish-Jewish politician
Herman Kruk (1897–1944), Polish-Jewish activist during World War II
Pavel Kruk (born 1992), Belarusian association football player
Mariusz Kruk, Polish sprint canoer 
Petro Kruk (born 1985), Ukrainian sprint canoer
Kruk, birth surname of Isaiah Shavitt
Pieter van der Kruk (1941–2020), Dutch weightlifter and shot putter
Pieter van der Kruk Jr. (born 1972), Dutch discus thrower and shot putter

See also
 
Krük
Kreuk

Polish-language surnames
Belarusian-language surnames
Ukrainian-language surnames
Dutch-language surnames
Surnames from nicknames